Amboy Crater is a dormant cinder cone volcano that rises above a  lava field in the eastern Mojave Desert of southern California, within Mojave Trails National Monument.

In 1973, Amboy Crater was designated the Amboy Crater National Natural Landmark.

Location
The Bullion Mountains are to the west, and the Bristol Mountains to the northeast.

Description

This cinder cone is estimated to be 79,000 years old (+/- 5,000 years) and was formed in layers of mostly vesicular pahoehoe during the Pleistocene geological period. The interior has a lava lake. Lava flows as old as Amboy Crater itself blanket the surrounding area. The most recent eruption was approximately 10,000 years ago.

The scenic and solitary Amboy Crater was a popular sight and stop for travelers on U.S. Route 66 in California before the opening of Interstate 40 in 1973. Other than a stretch of U.S. Route 66 in New Mexico, Amboy Crater is one of just a few extinct volcanoes along the entire route, so generations of U.S. Route 66 travelers from the 1920s through the 1960s could boast that they had climbed a real volcano. Visits decreased after Interstate 40 opened, but have increased in recent years with the nearby Mitchell Caverns, Mojave National Preserve, and renewed historical tourism interest in "old Route 66".

Visiting

The Federal Bureau of Land Management (BLM) recommends using the Western Cone Trail to reach the volcano peak's rim, a steep and rocky hiking trail. The trailhead is at the Amboy Crater day-use parking area, which provides shaded and open picnic tables and public restrooms. Regular desert precautions apply here: being alert for rattlesnakes and old military explosives, and having a hat, sunscreen, sturdy shoes and abundant drinking water. Educational and organized groups are advised to contact the BLM before going to Amboy Crater.

Media
Amboy Crater was used as a location in the 1959 movie Journey to the Center of the Earth. Fires were set inside the crater to simulate a volcanic eruption. Amboy Crater was also featured in the Viceland network show Abandoned, Season 1, episode 6: "Route 66". In HBO's From the Earth to the Moon Apollo 15 episode, Amboy Crater is overflown during astronaut training as a stand-in for the terrain of the San Francisco Volcanic Field outside of Flagstaff, AZ.

See also
 Lavic Lake volcanic field
 Pisgah Crater
 Cima Dome & Volcanic Field National Natural Landmark
 Mojave National Preserve
 Providence Mountains State Recreation Area
 Roy's Motel and Café

References

External links
 
 
 Amboy Crater National Natural Landmark at the Bureau of Land Management website
 BLM: Amboy Crater (panoramic video)

Cinder cones of the United States
Volcanoes of San Bernardino County, California
Mojave Trails National Monument
National Natural Landmarks in California
Natural history of the Mojave Desert
Protected areas of the Mojave Desert
Protected areas of San Bernardino County, California
Volcanic fields of California
Bureau of Land Management areas in California
Tourist attractions along U.S. Route 66
Volcanoes of California
IUCN Category V